Jessica Kihlbom (born 11 June 1989) is a Swedish racing cyclist. She competed in the 2013 UCI women's road race in Florence.

References

External links
 

1989 births
Living people
Swedish female cyclists
Sportspeople from Västra Götaland County
People from Svenljunga Municipality
20th-century Swedish women
21st-century Swedish women